Jesús Rafael Hernáiz Rodríguez (born January 8, 1945 in Santurce, Puerto Rico) is a retired Major League Baseball pitcher. He played during one season at the major league level for the Philadelphia Phillies. He was signed by the Chicago Cubs as an amateur free agent prior to the  season.

See also
 List of Major League Baseball players from Puerto Rico

References

External links

Jesús Hernáiz at Baseball Almanac

1945 births
Living people
Major League Baseball pitchers
Philadelphia Phillies players
Major League Baseball players from Puerto Rico
Nashville Sounds players
Quincy Cubs players
Huron Cubs players
Lodi Crushers players
Reading Phillies players
Toledo Mud Hens players
Columbus Clippers players
Eugene Emeralds players
Burlington Rangers players
Oklahoma City 89ers players
Spartanburg Phillies players